"Toutes les machines ont un cœur" (English translation: "All machines have a heart") is a song by French singer Maëlle. She released it as her debut single on 5 April 2019. The song was included on her debut album, Maëlle.

Composition 
The song was written by Zazie and composed and produced by Calogero.

Music video 
The music video, directed by Nur Casadevall., premiered on YouTube on 29 July 2019. It was shot in Barcelona in June. Maëlle was shooting it three days before her BAC in Social & Economics Sciences (SES).

Track listing 
 Digital download
 "Toutes les machines ont un cœur" – 4:19

Charts

References 

2019 songs
2019 singles
Songs written by Zazie
Songs with music by Calogero (singer)
Mercury Records singles